Kingston Presbyterian Church Cemetery is a historic cemetery located at Conway in Horry County, South Carolina. It contains fine examples of Victorian-era funerary art, especially those in the Beaty family plot. Portions of the cemetery site were first the old Kingston "burying ground", established about 1737, and burials continued until 1909.  It is co-located with the Kingston Presbyterian Church, listed on the National Register of Historic Places in 2009.

It was listed on the National Register of Historic Places in 1986.

Gallery

References

External links
 
 
 
 National Register of Historic Places Inventory-Nomination Form: Kingston Presbyterian Church Cemetery, June 1986
 Kingston Presbyterian Church Cemetery – Conway, South Carolina – U.S. National Register of Historic Places on Waymarking.com

Cemeteries on the National Register of Historic Places in South Carolina
Cemeteries in South Carolina
Protestant Reformed cemeteries
Buildings and structures in Conway, South Carolina
Tourist attractions in Horry County, South Carolina
National Register of Historic Places in Horry County, South Carolina